Alan Henderson (born 28 May 1965) is an English-born New Zealand bobsledder who competed from 1990 to 2006.

Competing in three Winter Olympics, 1998, 2002 and 2006; he earned his best finish of 23rd in the two-man event at Turin in 2006.

At the FIBT World Championships, Henderson earned his best finish of 22nd in the two-man event at Calgary in 2005.

Henderson was injured during a practice run for the four-man event at the 2006 Winter Olympics and did not compete. He retired following those games.

References 

1998 bobsleigh two-man results
2002 bobsleigh two-man results
2002 bobsleigh four-man results
2006 bobsleigh two-man results
2006 bobsleigh four-man results
FIBT profile

1965 births
Sportspeople from King's Lynn
Living people
Bobsledders at the 1998 Winter Olympics
Bobsledders at the 2002 Winter Olympics
Bobsledders at the 2006 Winter Olympics
English emigrants to New Zealand
New Zealand expatriate sportspeople in England
New Zealand male bobsledders
Olympic bobsledders of New Zealand